G-A-Y is a long-running gay nightclub, based at Heaven in Charing Cross, London. It started in 1976, and for many years was based at the London Astoria.

History
G-A-Y started in 1976 in the Sundown club in the basement of the London Astoria (later LA2) as a Monday night event called Bang!. It was founded by DJ Gary London, who also worked as a club promoter, along with Norman Scott, Damien Tony, and Jerry Collins. Gay club promoter and DJ Colin Peters (Peter Daubeney) ran Bang! (which by then had also expanded to Saturday night) and Propaganda (Thursday night), and his brother Jamie took over as promoter for a while after his passing. In the early 1990s, Bang! was acquired by DJ and promoter Jeremy Joseph, formerly employed by Peters, who oversaw its change of name to G-A-Y. At this point, G-A-Y expanded further from two nights a week to four, hosting at the LA2 on Mondays and Thursdays and the London Astoria on Fridays and Saturdays.

It operated from the London Astoria music venue for 15 years until July 2008. The Boston Globe described it as "London's largest gay-themed club night", NME reported that it "attracts 6,000 clubbers each week", and The Independent described it as "the one London gig that really matters" for "today's pop stars".

G-A-Y is associated with G-A-Y Bar and G-A-Y Late. A major stake in the brand was bought on 13 August 2007 by the MAMA Group. On Friday 3 October 2008, G-A-Y moved to the famous gay venue Heaven, which MAMA Group had acquired a few weeks earlier on 22 September 2008.

The G-A-Y Album

In 2000, a 40 track compilation album was released, featuring songs from some of the artists who had appeared at G-A-Y. A promotional campaign took place in the weeks leading up to release, including television and radio advertisements, a nationwide poster campaign and magazine advertisements in both the gay and teen press.

On Saturday 1 July 2000, a show was held at G-A-Y to promote the release of the album. Seven acts who appeared on the album performed. These acts were Shola Ama, All Saints, Bananarama, Dina Carroll, Billie Piper, Honeyz and Louise. Each act performed only one song, apart from Louise, who also performed her new single "2 Faced".

The G-A-Y album was released on Monday 3 July 2000 and peaked at number 18 in the UK compilations chart.

G-A-Y brand
The G-A-Y brand has expanded to two other bars in the same area: G-A-Y Late (located near the former Astoria site) and G-A-Y bar (located nearby in Soho's Old Compton Street). In April 2011, the G-A-Y brand arrived in Manchester's Canal Street gay village, with a G-A-Y bar opening in the former venue of Spirit Bar. On October 28th 2021 Jeremy Joseph announced that G-A-Y Manchester would be sold to Lee Kellow as a G-A-Y franchise. Jeremy Joseph remains the owner of G-A-Y Bar, G-A-Y Late & Heaven.

Controversies 
In March 2019, staff refused comedian Rosie Jones, who has cerebral palsy, entry into one of his nightclubs after they believed she was drunk. Owner Jeremy Joseph later apologised on Twitter.

In 2011, Joseph tweeted that straight people were not welcome to a One Direction gig, stating: "My birthday wish is for little girls to realise that G-A-Y is a lesbian and gay club so there's only one direction and that's no direction for them".

Joseph was also accused of racism after blaming a rise in crime in Soho on "Somalians"; this led to criticism from Black and South Asian LGBT groups.

In early 2022, G-A-Y Bar was reported to have been issued the lowest hygiene rating of '1' by Westminster City Council following an inspection in November 2021 after it found fruit flies, mould-covered and bacteria-laden ice machines, and water filtration systems which had not been cleaned nor serviced for 5 years.

Performances 

Saturday nights at G-A-Y/Heaven have seen many performances from a wide selection of artists and genres. Acts who have appeared at G-A-Y include:
Anastacia
B*Witched
Britney Spears
Ellie Goulding
Enrique Iglesias
Lady Gaga
Leona Lewis
Madonna
Marina and the Diamonds
McFly
Olly Murs
One Direction
The Human League

See also
Heaven (nightclub)
London Astoria

References

External links
G-A-Y website

LGBT nightclubs in London
Music venues in London